Stanley Wolukau-Wanambwa (born 1980) is a Ugandan-born British photographer, writer, and educator, living in the USA. His series One Wall a Web has been shown in a solo exhibition at Light Work in New York and the book of the work won the Paris Photo-Aperture Foundation PhotoBook Award's First PhotoBook Award.

Life and work
Wolukau-Wanambwa was born in Uganda and grew up in the UK. He obtained a BA in Philosophy and French from the University of Oxford, UK and an MFA in Photography from Virginia Commonwealth University.

He has lived in the USA since 2012 and as of 2021 was living in Rhode Island. He has lectured at Yale University, Cornell University, New York University, The New School, and State University of New York at Purchase; and been director of the photography MFA at Rhode Island School of Design.

The book One Wall a Web (2018) includes two photographic series made by Wolukau-Wanambwa in the USA—Our Present Invention (2012–2014) and All My Gone Life (2014–2017)—as well as an extensive essay and appropriated archival images. It "draws together poetry, critical writing, and photography to reflect on the ways that race, gender, and violence are woven into the fabric of (white) Western modernity. Set in America – with its history of injustice and its troubled present – One Wall a Web asks how documentary photography both participates in this complex play of forces, and suggests ways that we might find alternative pathways through it."

Publications

Books by Wolukau-Wanambwa
One Wall A Web. Amsterdam: Roma, 2018. . Photographs and an essay by Wolukau-Wanambwa as well as appropriated archival images.
Hiding in Plain Sight. Harun Farocki Institute; Motto, 2020. Co-authored with Ben Alper. .
The Lives of Images, Vol. 1: Repetition, Reproduction, and Circulation. Aperture Reader Series. New York: Aperture, 2021. Edited by Wolukau-Wanambwa. .
Dark Mirrors. London: Mack, 2021. . Sixteen essays by Wolukau-Wanambwa on Deana Lawson, Dana Lixenberg, Paul Pfeiffer, Arthur Jafa, Katy Grannan, Jason Koxvold, Robert Bergman and others.

Books with contributions by Wolukau-Wanambwa
Knives, Jason Koxvold. New York: Gnomic Book, 2017. .
The Image of Whiteness: Contemporary Photography and Racialization. London: Self Publish, Be Happy, 2019. Edited by Daniel C. Blight. .
But Still, It Turns. Edited by Paul Graham. London: Mack, 2021. . Published in conjunction with an exhibition at the International Center of Photography, New York, 2021.

Awards
Winner, First PhotoBook Award, Paris Photo-Aperture Foundation PhotoBook Award for One Wall a Web

Exhibitions

Solo exhibitions
One Wall a Web, Light Work, Syracuse, New York.

Group exhibitions
Greater New York, MoMA PS1, New York, 2020/21
But Still, It Turns: Recent Photography from the World, International Center of Photography, New York, 2021. Curated by Paul Graham.

References

Photography academics
21st-century British photographers
State University of New York at Purchase faculty
Virginia Commonwealth University alumni
Alumni of the University of Oxford
Living people
1980 births